Song of the Forge is a 1937 British musical film directed by Henry Edwards and starring Stanley Holloway, Lawrence Grossmith and Eleanor Fayre. The screenplay concerns an elderly blacksmith who refuses assistance from his wealthy son in spite of his own poverty.

It was made at Cricklewood Studios by Butcher's Film Service.

Cast
 Stanley Holloway as Joe / Sir William Barrett 
 Lawrence Grossmith as Den Dalton 
 Eleanor Fayre as Sylvia Brent 
 Davy Burnaby as Auctioneer 
 C. Denier Warren as Farmer George 
 Arthur Chesney as Huckleberry 
 Aubrey Fitzgerald as Oldest Inhabitant 
 Hal Walters as Sam Tucker 
 Charles Hayes as Mayor 
 Ian Wilson as Albert Meek 
 Hay Plumb as Assistant 
 Bruce Gordon as Ted Salter

References

Bibliography
 Low, Rachael. Filmmaking in 1930s Britain. George Allen & Unwin, 1985.
 Wood, Linda. British Films, 1927-1939. British Film Institute, 1986.

External links

1937 films
British musical films
1937 musical films
Films directed by Henry Edwards
Films shot at Cricklewood Studios
Films set in England
British black-and-white films
1930s English-language films
1930s British films